Vengeance is a 1984 book by George Jonas describing part of Operation Wrath of God, the Israeli assassination campaign launched after the 1972 Munich Olympics massacre. It was re-released as Vengeance: The True Story of an Israeli Counter-Terrorist Team or Vengeance: Sword of Gideon in some later editions and countries.

The main source of the book is also the main character, Yuval Aviv, known in the book as Avner.  A Mossad officer, he is recruited to lead a small team into Europe to assassinate a number of suspected PLO and Black September militants. Each of the book's chapters deals with a separate stage of the mission, including the background to each assassination. It has inspired both a 1986 made for television movie called Sword of Gideon and the 2005 Steven Spielberg film Munich.

References

1984 non-fiction books
Books about counterterrorism
Books about terrorism
Books about the Mossad
Non-fiction books adapted into films
Operation Wrath of God